Vyzhenka is a commune (selsoviet) in Vyzhnytsia Raion, Chernivtsi Oblast, Ukraine which belongs to Vyzhnytsia urban hromada, one of the hromadas of Ukraine.

References

Villages in Vyzhnytsia Raion